Janne Schäfer (born 28 May 1981 in Henstedt-Ulzburg) is a former breaststroke swimmer from Germany.

External links 
 Homepage
 

German female swimmers
Female breaststroke swimmers
1981 births
Living people
People from Henstedt-Ulzburg
European Aquatics Championships medalists in swimming
Universiade medalists in swimming
Universiade gold medalists for Germany
Medalists at the 2005 Summer Universiade
Medalists at the 2007 Summer Universiade
Sportspeople from Schleswig-Holstein